Coalition Together was a major opposition coalition in Serbia and FR Yugoslavia between 1996 and 1997. Coalition members were Serbian Renewal Movement, Democratic Party, Civic Alliance of Serbia and Democratic Party of Serbia. They participated in 1996 Yugoslavian parliamentary election finishing second and winning nearly 24% of votes.

Coalition also took part in 1996 Serbian local elections and won most of the largest cities, including Belgrade, Niš, Novi Sad, Kragujevac, and more than 40 municipalities. This was first major blow to Slobodan Milošević's regime since he took power in 1989. Large protests erupted after Milošević refused to accept electoral defeat.

Coalition Together eventually fell apart after conflict between the two leaders, Vuk Drašković and Zoran Đinđić.

Members

Electoral performance

Notes

References 

1996 establishments in Serbia
Defunct political party alliances in Serbia
Democracy movements